The C&C 51 Custom is a Canadian sailboat, that was designed by Robert W. Ball and first built in 1986.

Production
The design was built by C&C Yachts in Canada, but it is now out of production.

At least 5 examples were produced (based on Hull Identification Numbers (HIN) in the US Coast Guard database), while three more were under construction when the C&C factory in Niagara-on-the-Lake was destroyed by fire in 1994. The last example, Silent Partner II, was finished from a hull produced by C&C and spared by the fire, with the finishing work completed at the Wiggers Yard in Ontario, Canada, and was launched in 1997.

Design
The C&C 51 Custom is a small recreational keelboat, built predominantly of fibreglass, with wood trim. It has a masthead sloop rig, a raked stem, a reverse transom, an internally-mounted spade-type rudder controlled by a wheel and a fixed stub fin keel with a retractable centreboard. It displaces  and carries  of ballast.

The C&C 51 was designed as a centerboarder from the start. The centreboard is filled with lead ballast and has a hydraulic lift with a tackle arrangement in which the hydraulic cylinder moves about one quarter the distance needed to pull up the board. One example, Silent Partner II, was completed with a fixed keel.

There was a 51 XL version produced with a slightly taller mast and so a slightly larger sail area.

See also
List of sailing boat types

References

External links
 Original Factory Brochure - C&C Custom 51
 Original Factory Brochure - C&C Custom 51 xl

Keelboats
1980s sailboat type designs
Sailing yachts
Sailboat type designs by Robert W. Ball
Sailboat types built by C&C Yachts